Artem Igorevich Kuzakhmetov (born 19 February 1995) is a Russian sprint canoeist.

He participated at the 2018 ICF Canoe Sprint World Championships.

References

1995 births
Russian male canoeists
Living people
ICF Canoe Sprint World Championships medalists in kayak
Canoeists at the 2019 European Games
European Games medalists in canoeing
European Games gold medalists for Russia
Canoeists at the 2020 Summer Olympics
Olympic canoeists of Russia